Changsha (Changshanese pronunciation:,) is the capital and the largest city of Hunan Province of China. Changsha is the 17th most populous city in China with a population of over 10 million, and the third-most populous city in Central China, located in the lower reaches of Xiang River in northeastern Hunan. Changsha is also called Xingcheng (星城, 'Star City') and was once named Linxiang (临湘), Tanzhou (潭州), Qingyang (青阳) in ancient times. It is also known as Shanshuizhoucheng (山水洲城), with the Xiang River flowing through it, containing Mount Yuelu and Orange Isle. The city forms a part of the Greater Changsha Metropolitan Region along with Zhuzhou and Xiangtan, also known as Changzhutan City Cluster. Greater Changsha was named as one of the 13 emerging mega-cities in China in 2012 by the Economist Intelligence Unit. It is also a National Comprehensive Transportation Hub, and one of the first National Famous Historical and Cultural Cities in China. Changshanese, a kind of Xiang Chinese, is spoken in the downtown, while Ningxiangnese and Liuyangnese are also spoken in the counties and cities under its jurisdiction. As of the 2020 Chinese census, the prefecture-level city of Changsha had a population of 10,047,914 inhabitants.

Changsha has a history of more than 2,400 years of urban construction, and the name "Changsha" first appeared in the Yi Zhou Shu (逸周书）written in the pre-Qin era. In the Qin dynasty, the Changsha Commandery was set up, and in the Western Han dynasty, the Changsha Kingdom was established. The Tongguan Kiln in Changsha during the Tang dynasty produced the world's earliest underglaze porcelain, which was exported to Western Asia, Africa and Europe. In the Period of Five Dynasties, Changsha was the capital of Southern Chu. In the Northern Song dynasty, the Yuelu Academy (later become Hunan University) was one of the four major private academies over the last 1000 years, with the famous couplet "惟楚有才, 于斯为盛" (Only Chu has talent, and it is flourishing in this area) coming down to modern times. In the late Qing dynasty, Changsha was one of the four major trade cities for rice and tea in China. In 1904, it was opened to foreign trade, and gradually became a revolutionary city. In Changsha, Tan Sitong established the School of Current Affairs, Huang Xing founded the China Arise Society with the slogan "Expel the Tatar barbarians and revive Zhonghua" (驱除鞑虏，复兴中华), and Mao Zedong also carried out his early political movements here. During the Republican Era, Changsha became one of the major home fronts in the Second Sino-Japanese War, but the subsequent Wenxi Fire in 1938 and the three Battles of Changsha from 1939 to 1942 (1939, 1941 and 1941–42) hit Changsha's economy and urban construction hard.

Changsha is now one of the core cities in the Yangtze River Economic Belt and the Belt and Road Initiative, a Beta- (global second-tier) city by the GaWC, a new Chinese first-tier city and also a pioneering area for China-Africa economic and trade cooperation. As of 2020, Changsha Huanghua International Airport was one of the 40 busiest airports in the world. Known as the "Construction machinery capital of the world", Changsha has an industrial chain with construction machinery and new materials as the main industries, complemented by automobiles, electronic information, household appliances, and biomedicine. Since the 1990s, Changsha has begun to accelerate economic development, and then achieved the highest growth rate among China's major cities during the 2000s. The Xiangjiang New Area, the first state-level new area in Central China, was established in 2015. As of 2020, more than 164 Global 500 companies have established branches in Changsha. The city has the 29th largest skyline in the world. The HDI of Changsha reached 0.817 (very high) in 2019, which is roughly comparable to a moderately developed country.

The city houses four Double First-Class Universities: Hunan, National University of Defense Technology, Central South, and Hunan Normal, making Changsha the seat of several highly ranked educational institutions, and a major centre of research and innovation in the Asia-Pacific with a high level of scientific research, ranking 34th globally in 2022. Changsha is the birthplace of super hybrid rice, the Tianhe-1 supercomputer, China's first laser 3D printer, and China's first domestic medium-low speed maglev line. Changsha has been named the first "UNESCO City of Media Arts" in China. Changsha is home to Hunan Broadcasting System (HBS), the most influential provincial TV station in China.

Names
The name's origin is unknown. It is attested as early as the 11th , when a vassal lord of the area sent King Cheng of Zhou a gift described as a "Changsha softshell turtle". In the 2nd century AD, historian Ying Shao wrote that the Qin use of the name "Changsha" for the area was a continuance of its old name. The name originally described the area. The Chu metropolis was known as Qingyang. The capital of the Kingdom of Changshawithin the present-day city of Changshawas known as Linxiang, meaning "[place] Overlooking the Xiang River".

History

Early history

Development started around  when Changsha developed with the proliferation of Longshan culture, although there is no firm evidence of such a link. Evidence exists that people lived and thrived in the area during the Bronze Age. Numerous examples of pottery and other objects have been discovered.

Later Chinese legends related that the Flame and Yellow Emperors visited the area. Sima Qian's history states that the Yellow Emperor granted his eldest son Shaohao the lands of Changsha and its neighbors. During the Spring and Autumn Period (8th5th centuryBC), the Yue culture spread into the area around Changsha. During the succeeding Warring States Period, Chu took control of Changsha. Its capital, Qingyang, became an important southern outpost of the kingdom. In 1951–57 archaeologists explored numerous large and medium-sized Chu tombs from the Warring States Era. More than 3,000 tombs have been discovered. Under the Qin dynasty , Changsha was a staging post for expeditions south into Guangdong that led to its conquest and the establishment of the Nanyue kingdom.

Under the Han   Linxiang was the capital of the kingdom of Changsha. At first this was a client state held by Liu Bang's Baiyue ally Wu Rui that served as a means of controlling the restive Chu people and as a buffer state against Nanyue. By  Linxiang had city walls to protect it against uprisings and invasions. The famous Mawangdui tombs were constructed between 186 and  Lady Xin Zhui was buried in the earliest tomb  and, during its excavation in the 1970s, was found to have been very well preserved. More importantly, the tombs included the earliest surviving copies of the Tao Te Ching and other important literary and historical documents.

The kingdom was abolished under Wang Mang's short-lived Xin dynasty and briefly revived by the Eastern Han.

Following the turmoil of the Three Kingdoms, Emperor Wu of Jin granted Changsha to the sixth son of him named Sima Yi. The local government had over 100 counties at the beginning of the dynasty. Over the course of the dynasty, the local government of Changsha lost control over a few counties, leaving them to local rule.

The Sui dynasty (6th century) renamed Changsha Tan Prefecture or Tanzhou. Changsha's 3-tier administration was simplified to a 2-tier state and county system, eliminating the middle canton region. Under the Tang, Changsha prospered as a center of trade between central China and Southeast Asia but suffered during the Anshi Rebellion, when it fell to the rebels.

In early 10th century, Changsha served as the capital of the state of Nanchu (南楚）, or Southern Chu, established by Ma Yin (马殷）in 907, one of the ten southern war loads. Nanchu, lasted about 50 years, was the only independent state in the history that has ever been built in Hunan with Changsha as the capital, being eventually overthrown by Nantang (南唐）in 951.

Under the Song dynasty, the Yuelu Academy was founded in 976. It was destroyed by war in 1127 and rebuilt in 1165, during which year the celebrated philosopher Zhu Xi taught there. It was again destroyed by the Mongols during the establishment of the Yuan before being restored in the late 15th century under the Ming. Early 19th-century graduates of the academy formed what one historian called a "network of messianic alumni", including Zeng Guofan, architect of the Tongzhi Restoration, and Cai E, a major leader in the defense of the Republic of China. In 1903 the academy became Hunan High School. Modern-day Hunan University is also a descendant of the Yuelu Academy. Some of its buildings were remodeled from 1981 to 1986 according to their presumed original Song design.

During the Mongol conquest of the Southern Song, Tanzhou was fiercely defended by the local Song troops. After the city finally fell, the defenders committed mass suicide. Under the Ming (14th–17th centuries), Tanzhou was again renamed Changsha and made a superior prefecture. In the ninth year of Emperor Kaihuang (589 A.D.) of the Sui Dynasty, it was named after Zhaotan, Xiangzhou was changed to Tanzhou, and the Tanzhou General Manager was established. During the reign of Emperor Yang of the Sui Dynasty, Tanzhou was abolished, and Changsha County, a first-level administrative unit, was established, but the jurisdiction area was reduced.

Modern history 

Under the Qing (17th–20th centuries), Changsha was the capital of Hunan and prospered as one of China's chief rice markets. During the Taiping Rebellion, the city was besieged by the rebels in 1852 or 1854 for three months but never fell. The rebels moved on to Wuhan, but Changsha then became the principal base for the government's suppression of the rebellion.

The 1903 Treaty of Shanghai between the Qing and Japanese empires opened the city to foreign trade effective 1904. Most favored nation clauses in other unequal treaties extended the Japanese gains to the Western powers as well. Consequently, international capital entered the town and factories, churches, and schools were built. A college was started by Yale alumni, which later became a medical centre named Xiangya and a secondary school named the Yali School.

Following the Xinhai Revolution, further development followed the opening of the railway to Hankou in Hubei province in 1918, which was later extended to Guangzhou in Guangdong Province in 1936. Although Changsha's population grew, the city remained primarily commercial in character. Before 1937, it had little industry apart from some small cotton-textile, glass, and nonferrous-metal plants and handicraft enterprises.

Mao Zedong, the founder of the People's Republic of China, began his political career in Changsha. He was a student at the Hunan Number 1 Teachers' Training School from 1913 to 1918. He later returned as a teacher and principal from 1920 to 1922. The school was destroyed during the Chinese Civil War but has since been restored. The former office of the Hunan Communist Party Central Committee where Mao Zedong once lived is now a museum that includes Mao's living quarters, photographs and other historical items from the 1920s.

Until May 1927, communist support remained strong in Changsha before the massacre carried out by the right-wing faction of the KMT troops. The faction owed its allegiance to Chiang Kai-shek during its offensive against the KMT's left-wing faction under Wang Jingwei, who was then allied closely with the Communists. The purge of communists and suspected communists was part of Chiang's plans for consolidating his hold over the KMT, weakening Wang's control, and thereby over the entire China. In a period of twenty days, Chiang's forces killed more than ten thousand people in Changsha and its outskirts.

During the Second Sino-Japanese War (1937–45), Changsha's strategic location made it the focus of four campaigns by the Imperial Japanese Army to capture it from the Nationalist Army: these campaigns were the 1st Changsha, the 2nd Changsha, the 3rd Changsha, and the 4th Changsha. The city was able to repulse the first three attacks thanks to Xue Yue's leadership, but ultimately fell into Japanese hands in 1944 for a year until the Japanese were defeated in a counterattack and forced to surrender. Before these Japanese campaigns, the city was already virtually destroyed by the 1938 Changsha Fire, a deliberate fire ordered by Kuomintang commanders who mistakenly feared the city was about to fall to the Japanese; Generalissimo Chiang Kai-shek had suggested that the city be burned so that the Japanese force would gain nothing after entering it.

Following the Communist victory in the Chinese Civil War, Changsha slowly recovered from its former damage. Since Deng Xiaoping's Reform and Opening Up Policy, Changsha has rapidly developed since the 1990s, becoming one of the important cities in the central and western regions. At the end of 2007, Changsha, Zhuzhou, and Xiangtan received approval from the State Council for the "Chang-Zhu-Tan (Greater Changsha) Resource-Saving and Environment-Friendly Society Comprehensive Reform Pilot Area", an important engine in the rise of central China. In 2015, Xiangjiang New Area was approved as a national new area.

Geography 

Changsha is in northeast Hunan Province, the lower reaches of the Xiang River and the western part of the Changliu Basin. It lies between 111°53' to 114°15' east longitude and 27°51' to 28°41' north latitude. The city borders Yichun and Pingxiang of Jiangxi Province in the east, Zhuzhou and Xiangtan in the south, Loudi and Yiyang in the west, and Yueyang and Yiyang in the north. It is about 230 kilometres from east to west and about 88 kilometres from north to south. Changsha's highest point is Mount Qixing in Daweishan Town, . The lowest point is Zhanhu in Qiaokou Town, .

The Xiang is the main river in the city, running  northward through the territory. 15 tributaries flow into the Xiang, of which Liuyang, Laodao, Jinjiang and Wei are the four largest. The Xiang divides the city into two parts. The eastern part is mainly commercial and the west is mainly cultural and educational. On 10 October 2001, the seat of Changsha City was transferred from Fanzheng Street to Guanshaling. Since then, the economy of both sides of the Xiang River has achieved a balanced development.

Hydrology 
Most of the rivers in Changsha belong to the Xiang River system. In addition to the Xiangjiang River, 15 tributaries flow into the Xiang, mainly including Liuyang River, Laodao River, Minjiang River, and Qinshui River. 302 tributaries are more than five kilometers long, including 289 in the Xiang River Basin. According to the tributary grading there are 24 primary tributaries, 128 secondary tributaries, 118 third tributaries, and 32 tributaries; and 13 are Zijiang water systems; a fairly complete water system is formed, and the river network is densely distributed. Hydrological characteristics of Changsha: the water system is complete, the river network dense; the water volume greater, the water energy resources abundant; the winter not frozen, and the sediment content small.

Geological characteristics 
The geological features of Changsha City are: the formation is fully exposed, the granite body is widely distributed, and the geological structure is complex. The strata of each geological and historical period are exposed in Changsha City, and the oldest stratum was formed about one billion years ago. About 600 million years ago, Changsha was a sea, but the sea was not deep. Later, seawater gradually withdrew from the east and west, and most of Liuyang, Changsha, and Wangcheng rose out of the sea and became the northwestern edge of the ancient land of Jiangnan. About 140 million years ago, the sea leaching in the Changsha area ended and it became a land. Due to the influence of crustal movement and geological structure, a long-shaped mountain depression basin, the Chang (Sha) Ping (Jiang) Basin, was formed. Beginning of the new generation, the entire Changping Basin has risen to land. About 3.5 million years ago, the third ice age occurred on the earth, and Liuyang retained the remains of glacier landforms.

Climate 
With a monthly possible-sunshine percentage ranging from 19% in March to 57% in August, the city receives 1,545 hours of bright sunshine annually. The four seasons are distinct. The summers are long and very hot, with heavy rainfall, and autumn is comfortable and is the driest season. Winter is chilly and overcast with lighter rainfall more likely than downpours; cold snaps occur with temperatures occasionally dropping below freezing. Spring is especially rainy and humid with the sun shining less than 30% of the time.

Administration 
The municipality of Changsha exercises jurisdiction over six districts, one county and two county-level cities:

Government

Economy

Changsha is one of China's 15 most "developed and economically advanced" cities. Changsha is now one of the core cities in the South Central China region, the Yangtze River Economic Belt and the Belt and Road Initiative, a Beta- (global second-tier) city by the Globalization and World Cities Research Network, a new Chinese first-tier city and also a pioneering area for China-Africa economic and trade cooperation. Known as the "Construction machinery capital of the world", Changsha has an industrial chain with construction machinery and new materials as the main industries, complemented by automobiles, electronic information, household appliances, and biomedicine.

Since the 1990s, Changsha has begun to accelerate economic development, and then achieved the highest growth rate among China's major cities during the 2000s. The Xiangjiang New Area, the first state-level new area in Central China, was established in 2015. Changsha also has a prominent media and publishing industry, and has been named the first "UNESCO City of Media Arts" in China. Changsha is home to Hunan Broadcasting System (HBS), the most influential provincial TV station in China.

In 2017, Changsha made its way into the 1-trillion-yuan GDP club, becoming the 13th city in China with a GDP of one trillion yuan (154 billion US dollars). Moreover, the financial news portal Yicai.com released its 2017 ranking of China's new first-tier cities, and Changsha was a newcomer. As of 2020, more than 164 Global 500 companies have established branches in Changsha. As a new first-tier city, Changsha is rated #10 in terms of its commercial worth.

As of 2021, Changsha's GDP exceeded RMB 1.327 trillion (US$208 billion in the nominal and US$318 billion in PPP), making it the 5th most wealthy city in the South-Central China region after Shenzhen, Guangzhou, Hong Kong, and Wuhan and the 2nd richest city in Central China region after Wuhan. Changsha's GDP (nominal) was US$208 billion in 2021, exceeding that of Ukraine and Hungary, with a GDP of US$200 billion and US$182 billion, the 22nd and 23rd largest economies in Europe respectively. The city's GDP per capita exceeded $20,000 in nominal ( $30,000 in PPP) in 2021, which is considered a high-income status by the World Bank and a primary developed city according to the international standard. Changsha has also led the development of the night economy and as of 2021, it ranked 2nd nationwide after Chongqing in terms of nighttime economic power according to the "China City Night Economy Impact Report 2021-2022".

According to the 2022 Hurun Global Rich List, Changsha ranks among the top 35 cities globally and 11th in Greater China (after Beijing, Shanghai, Shenzhen, Hong Kong, Hangzhou, Guangzhou, Taipei, Foshan, Suzhou, and Ningbo) in terms of resident billionaires.

Changsha's nominal GDP is projected to be among the world's top 50 largest cities according to a study by Oxford Economics in 2035 and its nominal GDP per capita will reach US$41,000 in 2030.

Development Zones

The Changsha ETZ was founded in 1992. It is located in Xingsha in eastern Changsha. Near the zone are National Highways 319 and 107 as well as the G4 Beijing–Hong Kong and Macau Expressway. The zone is also very close to Changsha's downtown area and the railway station, while the distance between the zone and the city's airport is a mere . The major industries in the zone include the high-tech industry, the biology project technology industry, and the new material industry.

The Liuyang ETZ is a national biological industry base created on 10 January 1998, located in Dongyang Town. Its pillar industry comprises biological pharmacy, Information technology and Health food. , It has more than 700 registered enterprises. The total industrial output value of the zone hits 85.6 billion yuan (US$13.7 billion) and its business income is 100.2 billion yuan (US$16.1 billion).

Tourism

Places of Interest 

Tourism is a major industry in Changsha. Changsha has been consistently ranked as China's top tourist city. There are several sites in Changsha, notably the Yuelu Academy and the Changsha Meixihu International Culture and Arts Centre, a cultural complex designed by the British firm Zaha Hadid Architects overlooking the Meixi Lake at the Meixihu subdistrict of the city. Others include the Young Mao Zedong statue on Orange Isle, Meixi Lake Park, Window of the World, Kaifu Temple and Changsha Ice World.

Demographics 
As of the 2020 Chinese census, Changsha was home to 10,047,914 people, whom 7,355,198 lived in its built-up (or metro) area made of the 6 urban Districts plus Changsha County largely conurbated. The majority of people living in Changsha are Han Chinese. A sizeable population of ethnic minority groups also live in Changsha. The three largest are the Hui, Tujia, and Miao peoples. The 2000 census showed that 48,564 members of ethnic minorities live in Changsha, 0.7% of the population. The other minorities make up a significantly smaller part of the population. Twenty ethnic minorities have fewer than 1,000 members living in the city.

Culture

Media 
Hunan Broadcasting System is China's largest television after China Central Television (CCTV). Its headquarters is in Changsha and produces some of the most popular programs in China, including Super Girl. These programs have also brought a new entertainment industry into the city, which includes singing bars, dance clubs, theater shows, as well as related businesses including hair salons, fashion stores, and shops for hot spicy snacks at night (especially during summer). While Changsha has developed into an entertainment hub, the city has also become increasingly westernized and has attracted a growing number of foreigners.

Cuisine 
Various types of cuisine are found in Changsha, yet the hot and spicy Hunan cuisine typical of the region remains the most popular.  The snack chain Juewei Duck Neck, which now has over 10,000 outlets, originates from Changsha.

The city has its own siu yeh culture.

In May 2008, the BBC broadcast, as part of its Storyville documentary series, the four-part The Biggest Chinese Restaurant in the World, which explored the inner workings of the 5,000-seating-capacity West Lake Restaurant (Xihu Lou Jiujia) in Changsha.

During the Warring States period, Qu Yuan, a great patriotic poet, recorded many dishes in Hunan in his famous poem "The Soul"(). During the Western Han dynasty, there were 109 varieties of dishes in Hunan, and there were nine categories of cooking methods. After the Six Dynasties, Hunan's food culture was rich and active. The Ming and Qing dynasties are the golden age for the development of Hunan cuisine. The unique style of Hunan cuisine is basically a foregone conclusion. At the end of the Qing dynasty, there were two kinds of Hunan cuisine restaurants in Changsha. In the early years of the Republic of China, the famous Dai (Yang Ming) School, Sheng (Shan Zhai) School, Xiao (Lu Song) School, and Zuyu School appeared in various genres, which laid the historical status of Hunan cuisine. Since the founding of New China, especially since the reform and opening up, it has been better developed.

Sports 
Changsha has one of China's largest multi-purpose sports stadiums—Helong Stadium, with 55,000 seats. The stadium was named after the Communist military leader He Long. It is the home ground of local football team Hunan Billows F.C., which plays in China League Two. The more modest 6,000-seat Hunan Provincial People's Stadium, also located in Changsha, is used by the team for their smaller games.

Historical culture 
Changsha hosts the Hunan Provincial Museum. 180,000 historical significant artifacts ranging from the Zhou dynasty to the recent Qing dynasty are hosted in the 51,000 acres of space in the museum.

Mawangdui is a well-known tomb located 22 kilometers east of Changsha. It was discovered with numerous artifacts from the Han dynasty.  Numerous Silk Funeral banners surround the tomb, along with a wealth of classical texts. The tomb of Lady Dai lies in Mawangdui is well known due to its well-preserved state: scientists were able to detect blood, conduct an autopsy and determined that she died of heart disease due to a poor diet.

Changsha is a sister city with St. Paul, Minnesota.  St. Paul is developing a China garden at Phalen Park, based on the design of architects from Changsha. Current plans include a pavilion replicating one in Changsha, while in return St. Paul will send the city five statues of the Peanuts characters.  They will be placed in Phalen's sister park, Yanghu Wetlands.

Education and research

Research and Innovation 
Changsha is the birthplace of super hybrid rice, Yinhe-1, the first China's supercomputer built in the 1980s, the Tianhe-1 supercomputer, China's first laser 3D printer, and China's first domestic medium-low speed maglev line. In November 2010, the National Supercomputing Changsha Center was established at Hunan University, becoming the first National Supercomputing Center in Central China and third National Supercomputing Center in China, after those in Tianjin and Shenzhen.

Changsha is a major city for research and innovation in China, as well as in the Asia-Pacific region. It ranked 34th globally, 17th in the Asia & Oceania region, 13th in China, 5th in South Central region after (Guangzhou, Wuhan, Hong Kong and Shenzhen), and 2nd in Central China region after (Wuhan) by scientific research outputs, as tracked by the Nature Index 2022 Science Cities.  It also ranked 41st globally in the "Top 100 Science & Technology Cluster Cities" rankings based on "publishing and patent performance" released by the Global Innovation Index 2022. As of 2021, Changsha had 97 independent scientific research institutions, 14 national engineering and technology research centers, 15 national key engineering and technology laboratories, and 12 national enterprise technology centers.

As of 2020, Changsha ranked 8th in the top 10 China's innovation-oriented cities, and 6th (behind Shenzhen, Hangzhou, Shanghai, Chengdu and Beijing) in the Top 10 China's most attractive cities for talent, released by the 21st Century Business Herald report. Changsha has held the title "China's Leading Smart City" since 2021.

Colleges and universities

Changsha has long been the seat of several ancient schools and academies. The Yuelu Academy (later become Hunan University) was one of the four most prestigious academies in China over the last 1000 years. The city is also the site of the Hunan Medical University (later become Central South University), which was established in 1914. As of 2022, Changsha hosts 57 institutions of higher education (excluding adult colleges), ranking 9th nationwide and 4th among all cities in the South Central China region after Guangzhou, Wuhan and Zhengzhou. Changsha ranked among the top 10 cities in the whole country and among the top three cities in South Central China region with strong education based on an evaluation to grade Chinese universities' discipline levels, including A+, A, and A− issued by the Ministry of Education as of 2020. There are three Project 985 universities in Changsha: Central South University, Hunan University, and the National University of Defense Technology, the third highest among all cities in China after Beijing and Shanghai. Hunan Normal University is the key construction university of the national 211 Project. These four national key universities are included in the Double First-Class Universities, making Changsha the seat of several highly ranked universities.

Hunan University and Central South University are the only two universities in Changsha to appear in the world's top 300 of the Academic Ranking of World Universities and the U.S. News & World Report Best Global University Ranking. These two universities are placed among the world's top 100 universities ranked by Nature Index. Hunan Normal University, the National University of Defense and Technology and Changsha University of Science and Technology also located in Changsha, were ranked in the world's top 701 of the Academic Ranking of World Universities. Hunan Agricultural University was ranked in the top 901 globally of the Academic Ranking of World Universities. Central South University of Forestry and Technology were ranked # 1429 in the 2022 Best Global Universities by the U.S. News & World Report Best Global University Ranking. Hunan University of Chinese Medicine ranked the best in Hunan and 33rd nationwide among Chinese Medical Universities.

National key public universities
Central South University (Project 211, Project 985, Double First Class University)
Hunan University (Project 211, Project 985, Double First Class University)
Hunan Normal University (Project 211, Double First Class University)
National University of Defense Technology (Project 211, Project 985, Double First Class University)

Provincial key public universities

 Central South University of Forestry and Technology
 Changsha University of Science and Technology
 Hunan Agricultural University
 Hunan First Normal University
 Hunan University of Technology and Commerce
 Hunan University of Chinese Medicine
General undergraduate universities (public)

 Changsha University
 Hunan University of Finance and Economics
 Hunan Police Academy
 Hunan Women's University
 Changsha Normal University

General undergraduate universities (private)

 Changsha Medical University
 Hunan International Economics University
 Hunan Institute of Information Technology
Vocational and technical colleges/universities
Changsha Aeronautical Vocational and Technical College
 Changsha Social Work College

Note: Institutions without full-time bachelor programs are not listed.

International schools
 Changsha WES Academy

Notable high schools
Yali High School
The High School Affiliated to Hunan Normal University
Changjun High School
The First High School of Changsha

Notable primary schools
 Changsha Experimental Primary School
 Datong Primary School
 Qingshuitang Primary School
 Shazitang Primary School
 Yanshan Primary School
 Yucai Primary School
 Yuying Primary School

Transportation

Changsha is well connected by roads, river, rail, and air transportation modes, and is a regional hub for industrial, tourist, and service sectors.

The city's public transportation system consists of an extensive bus network with over 100 lines. Changsha Metro is planning a 6-line network. Metro Line 2 opened on 29 April 2014 and 20 stations for Line 2 opened on 28 June 2016. A further four lines are planned for construction by 2025. A maglev link running  between Changsha South station and Changsha airport opened in April 2016, with a construction cost of €400m. Connecting Changsha with Zhuzhou and Xiangtan, Changzhutan Intercity Rail opened on 26 December 2016.

The G4, G4E, G4W2, G5513 and G0401 of National Expressways, G107, G106 and G319 of National Highways, S20, S21, S40, S41, S50, S60 and S71 of Hunan provincial Expressways, connect the Changsha metro area nationally. There are three main bus terminals in Changsha: the South Station, East Station and West Station, dispatching long- and short-haul trips to cities within and outside the province of Hunan. Changsha is surrounded by major rivers, including the Xiang and its tributaries such as the Liuyang, Jin, Wei, Longwanggang and Laodao. Ships mainly transport goods from Xianing port in North Changsha domestically and internationally.

Changsha Railway Station is in the city center and provides express and regular services to most Chinese cities via the Beijing–Guangzhou and Shimen–Changsha Railways. The Changsha South Railway Station is a new high-speed railway station in Yuhua district on the Beijing–Guangzhou High-Speed Railway (as part of the planned Beijing–Guangzhou–Shenzhen–Hong Kong High-Speed Railway). The station, with eight platforms, opened on 26 December 2009. Since then passenger volume has increased greatly. The Hangzhou-Changsha-Huaihua sector of the Shanghai-Changsha-Kunming high-speed railway entered service in 2014.

Changsha Huanghua International Airport is a regional hub for China Southern Airlines. The airport has daily flights to major cities in China, including Beijing, Shanghai and Guangzhou, as well as Hong Kong and Macau. Other major airlines also provide daily service between Changsha and other domestic and international destinations. The airport provides direct flights to 45 major international cities, including Taipei, Los Angeles, Singapore, Seoul, Pusan, Osaka, Tokyo, Kuala Lumpur, London (Heathrow Airport), Frankfurt and Sydney.  the airport handled 70,011 people daily. Due to the global effect of the COVID-19 pandemic, Changsha Huanghua International Airport was the 34th busiest airport in the world in 2020, making its debut in the world's top 50 busiest airports for the first time.

City honors and rankings 

 41st globally in the "Top 100 Science & Technology Cluster Cities" rankings by "publishing and patent performance" released by the Global Innovation Index 2022
67th worldwide in the Global Cities Outlook rankings of the 2018 Global Cities Report released by AT Kearney
 68th worldwide in terms of "Urban Economic Competitiveness" in 2019 jointly released by the Chinese Academy of Social Sciences (CASS) and the United Nations Programme for Human Settlements (UN-Habitat)
 34th globally and 17th in the Asia & Oceania region in the "Top 200 cities" by scientific research outputs released by the Nature Index 2022 Science Cities Rankings.
 27th in the world by numbers of 150m+completed buildings as of 2021
Changsha IFS Tower T1 ranks as the 16th tallest completed building in the world as of 2020
The first Chinese city to be recognized as a " World Creative City in Media Arts" by UNESCO
Changsha was classified as a Beta- (global second tier) city together with Manchester (the U.K), Geneva (Switzerland) and Seattle (the U.S) by the Globalization and World Cities Research Network.
China's Top 10 Most Influential Cities of Nighttime Economy
Top 10 "China's Happiest Cities"
One of the China's new first-tier cities in 2017
The 10 fastest growing cities in the world Changsha's nominal GDP is projected to be among the world top 50 largest cities according to a study by Oxford Economics in 2035, and its nominal GDP per capita will reach US$41,000 in 2030.

International relations

Twin towns – sister cities

By the end of June 2018, Changsha has established friendly city relationship with 49 foreign cities.

Changsha is twinned with:

 Brazzaville, Congo
 Gumi, Gyeongsangbuk-do, South Korea
 Kagoshima, Kagoshima, Japan
 Mogilev, Mogilev Region, Belarus
 Mons, Hainaut, Belgium
 New Haven, Connecticut, United States
 Jersey City, New Jersey, United States
 Annapolis, Maryland, United States
 Saint Paul, Minnesota, United States
 Fribourg, Canton of Fribourg, Switzerland
 City of Auburn, New South Wales,  Australia
 Entebbe, Uganda

Consulates General/Consulates

Notable people

The following people are from the Greater Changsha Metropolitan Region:
 Mao Zedong – Founding father of the People's Republic of China
 Zeng Guofan – Most influential politician of China in 19th century
 Liu Shaoqi – President of the People's Republic of China (PRC), 1959–1968
 Zhu Rongji – Premier of the People's Republic of China, 1998–2003
 Hu Yaobang – General Secretary of the Chinese Communist Party (1982–1987)
 Yang Kaihui – Mao Zedong's second wife
 Huang Xing – Chinese revolutionary leader and the first army commander-in-chief of the Republic of China
 Tian Han – Author of the lyrics to "March of the Volunteers", China's national anthem
 Wang Tao – Economist
 Zhou Guangzhao – Theoretical physicist and recipient of the "Two Bombs, One Satellite" Meritorious Award
 Zhou Jianping – Aerospace engineer and chief designer of China Manned Space Program
 Qi Xueqi – General in the Kuomintang (KMT)
 Lei Feng – A People's Liberation Army's cultural icon
 Liang Heng – Writer and literary scholar
 Tan Dun – Contemporary composer (soundtracks for the films Crouching Tiger, Hidden Dragon and Hero)
 Tang Sulan – Writer and politician
 Zhang Ye – Singer
 Xiong Ni – Olympic male diver and gold medalist
 Leo Li – Actress and singer-songwriter
 Li Xiaopeng – Olympic male gymnast and gold medalist
 Liu Yun – Actress
 Liu Xuan – Olympic female gymnast and gold medalist
 Meng Jia – Singer and actress, former member of the Korean-Chinese girl group Miss A
 Lay (entertainer) – A member of South Korean-Chinese boy band under SM entertainment, Exo
 Qi Baishi – Painter
 Shen Wei – Dancer and the choreographer of modern dance for the 2008 Beijing Olympics
 He Jiong – One of the most famous TV show hosts in China
 Lexie Liu – Singer-songwriter and rapper
 Can Xue – Avant-garde fiction writer
 Xue Yiwei - Writer living in Montreal
Spanish vlogger Jabiertzo has been a resident of the city for over ten years and has a Spanish-language YouTube channel where he describes life in Changsha and nearby regions.

Astronomy
Changsha is represented by the star Zeta Corvi in a Chinese constellation.

See also
 Cathedral of the Immaculate Conception (Changsha)
 List of twin towns and sister cities in China

References

External links 

 Changsha Interactive Map, Information on Locations
 Changsha Government official website 
 Changsha National High-Tech Industrial Development Zone 

 
Cities in Hunan
Provincial capitals in China
Populated places established in the 1st millennium BC
National Forest Cities in China